Most Rev. Kenneth Anthony Angell (August 3, 1930 – October 4, 2016) was an American prelate of the Catholic Church. He served as bishop of the Diocese of Burlington in Vermont from 1992 to 2005.  He previously served as an auxiliary bishop of the Diocese of Providence in Rhode Island from 1974 to 1992.

Biography

Early life 
One of three children, Kenneth Angell was born on August 3, 1930, in Providence, Rhode Island, to Henry and Mae (née Cooney) Angell. After attending public elementary schools in East Providence, Rhode Island, he studied at Our Lady of Providence Seminary in Warwick, Rhode Ilsand and at St. Mary's Seminary in Baltimore, Maryland.

Priesthood 
Angell was ordained to the priesthood by Bishop Russell McVinney for the Diocese of Providence on May 26, 1957. He then served as parochial vicar at St. Mark Parish in Jamestown, Rhode Island and at Sacred Heart Parish in Pawtucket, Rhode Island. After serving at St. Mary's Parish in Newport, Rhode Island, Angell then received his first pastorate at St. John's Parish in Providence. 

From 1968 to 1972, Angell served as assistant chancellor for the diocese and secretary to Bishop McVinney. He served as chancellor under Bishop Louis Gelineau from 1972 to 1974 and was raised to the rank of monsignor by the Vatican in December 1972. Angell became vicar general of the diocese in August 1974.

Auxiliary Bishop of Providence 
On August 9, 1974, Angell was appointed auxiliary bishop of the Diocese of Providence and Titular Bishop of Septimunicia by Pope Paul VI. He received his episcopal consecration on October 7, 1974, from Bishop Gelineau, with Archbishop John Whealon and Bishop John Hackett serving as co-consecrators, at the Cathedral of Sts. Peter and Paul in Providence. 

In 1989, Angell promised to "take care of it" when the Providence priest Normand Demers was arrested and jailed for misconduct with boys while working at The Haitian Project; Demers was later brought back to work in the diocese. Angell testified in a 1990 lawsuit that he did not take allegations against another priest, Rev. William O'Connell, seriously. O'Connell was later convicted and served a short sentence before moving to New Jersey, where he committed more crimes and died in prison.

Bishop of Burlington 
Angell was named the eighth bishop of the Diocese of Burlington by Pope John Paul II on October 6, 1992. Angell was installed at the Cathedral of the Immaculate Conception in Burlington on November 9, 1992.

Faced with a shortage of priests in Burlington, and a decline in weekly Mass attendance, Angell consolidated Sacred Heart and St. Francis de Sales Parishes in Bennington as well as St. Cecilia and St. Frances Cabrini in East Barre, and closed Our Lady of the Lake in St. Albans.  Angell's younger brother, producer David Angell, and his wife Lynn died on September 11, 2001, during the hijacking of American Airlines Flight 11 which crashed into North Tower of World Trade Center in New York City. killing all passengers on-board Angell later said, "Our family was devastated, and yet in times of such crisis you get strength that's rather incredible. You don't really know where it comes from. It comes ultimately from God, but it comes through many people who are supportive. It comes from one's faith and the belief that the Lord takes care of us, and that his will must be done." Angell has been criticized for his management of sexual abuse allegations during his tenure as auxiliary bishop in the Diocese of Providence, which experienced the longest legal battle over such allegations in the nation and later announced a $13.5 million settlement in 36 different lawsuits in 2002. 

During his tenure as bishop in Burlington, records show Angell allowed six accused priests to remain in active ministry within Vermont. He refused to identify the priests publicly, but then gave their names to the Vermont Attorney General and placed them under suspension. At a news conference in March 2005, Angell described the sexual abuse scandals as the most difficult challenge he faced during his time as bishop. He said, "People have been so shocked by all of this and it's a wonderful compliment to us really, in the sense that they expect so much more of us than anyone else and we shouldn't fail them. It's been very difficult and difficult for these priests too [who] have been in trouble. The victims first and foremost have my concern. After that I think of the priests how because of one, one little lapse or something, something terrible happened. I can't help but feel sorry for them. I decry what they did."

Retirement and legacy 
Angell received Bishop Salvatore Matano as his coadjutor bishop in April 2005. On reaching the mandatory retirement age of 75, Angell submitted his letter of resignation to Pope Benedict XVI in August 2005. The pope accepted his resignation on November 9, 2005. Kenneth Angell died in Winooski, Vermont, on October 4, 2016, from a stroke.

Viewpoints

Iraq invasion 
In response to the United States invasion of Iraq in March 2003, Angell said, "Our hopes of avoiding war were quashed today, but our prayers for peace will not end until this war does.... We pray for the safety and deliverance of the innocent citizens in Iraq, that they be protected from harm and freed from oppression. We pray their terror will be of short duration and that their rewards will be a new country based on freedom and democratic principles, supported by a united international community."

Capital punishment 
In 2001,  Angell wrote to the Vermont General Assembly to express his opposition to capital punishment, saying, "We must not perpetuate the crime of murder by becoming a society that kills for retribution.... We must not promote or justify a culture of vengeance. We cannot hope to teach that killing is wrong by killing."

Same-sex marriage 
A strong opponent of same-sex marriage, he unsuccessfully campaigned against H.B. 847 in the Vermont General Assembly, which granted civil unions to same-sex couples with the same rights and privileges accorded to married couples in 2000. Speaking to the Vermont House of Representatives, he said, "Do not let the court or anybody else push you around. You have no duty, moral or constitutional, to weaken the institution of marriage. If the court thinks otherwise, then let the people overrule the court. This is the United States of America. We are not ruled by kings, whether on a throne or in the courtroom."

References

External links 
Official site of the Holy See

1930 births
2016 deaths
Catholics from Rhode Island
Clergy from Providence, Rhode Island
Roman Catholic Diocese of Providence
Roman Catholic bishops of Burlington
20th-century Roman Catholic bishops in the United States
21st-century Roman Catholic bishops in the United States
Religious leaders from Rhode Island